Eucalyptus copulans is a species of small, critically endangered tree only known in the wild from one or two individual plants in the Blue Mountains of New South Wales. It has smooth bark, usually with several main stems, lance-shaped adult leaves, flower buds in group of eleven or more and more or less spherical fruit.

Description
Eucalyptus copulans is a tree, often with several main trunks and with smooth grey or green bark that is shed in ribbons.

Taxonomy and naming
Eucalyptus copulans was first formally described in 1991 by Lawrie Johnson and Ken Hill from a specimen collected in 1957 near Wentworth Falls railway station. The description was published in the journal Telopea.

The authors considered that this species is similar to both E. stellulata and E. moorei but that it could not be a hybrid of these species because of its geographical isolation from them. Andrew Vernon Slee, Ian Brooker, Siobhan Duffy and Judy West, the authors of Eucalypts of Australia, consider it to be a subspecies, Eucalyptus moorei subsp. moorei.

The specific epithet (copulans) is derived from the Latin word copulo meaning "to couple" or "to join", referring to "the link between E. moorei and E. stellulata formed by this species".

Distribution and habitat
This species was only ever known from woodland and in swampy sites near Wentworth Falls and the population near the railway station was destroyed in a bushfires in the 1950s. Only two wild-growing specimens are known from the area, growing in a nature reserve.

Conservation status
This eucalypt is classified as "endangered" under the Commonwealth Government Environment Protection and Biodiversity Conservation Act 1999 (EPBC) Act and the New South Wales Government  Biodiversity Conservation Act 2016. The main threats to the species include its small population size, inappropriate fire regimes and habitat degradation.

References

copulans
Flora of New South Wales
Trees of Australia
Myrtales of Australia
Plants described in 1991
Taxa named by Lawrence Alexander Sidney Johnson
Taxa named by Ken Hill (botanist)